In set theory, a supertransitive class is a transitive class which includes as a subset the power set of each of its elements.

Formally, let A be a transitive class. Then A is supertransitive if and only if

Here P(x) denotes the power set of x.

See also

 Transitive set
 Rank (set theory)

References

Set theory